Racey are a British pop group, formed in 1976 in Weston-super-Mare, Somerset, England, by Clive Wilson and Phil Fursdon.  They achieved success in the late 1970s and early 1980s, with hits such as "Lay Your Love on Me" and "Some Girls". Their 1979 song "Kitty" was an international hit in 1981 for Toni Basil when she reworked it into "Mickey".

Career
The original line-up featured Richard Gower (born 1955, Hackney, London, England; vocals, keyboards, piano, guitar), Phil Fursdon (guitar, vocals), Pete Miller (bass, vocals) and Clive Wilson (drums, percussion, vocals). After early success in their local pub circuit, they came to the attention of Mickie Most. Racey's first single, "Baby It's You", was penned by Smokie members Chris Norman and Pete Spencer, and released in 1978. Their second single, "Lay Your Love on Me", was the group's first hit single, peaking at No.3 in the UK Singles Chart in late 1978 through to early 1979. Their third single, "Some Girls", was also written by Mike Chapman and reached No.2 in the UK charts. ("Some Girls" was later recorded by Barry Manilow for his 1982 "Here Comes the Night" album.)

The band parted company with Chinn and Chapman after the album was released and, although they continued to play and tour, they released only a few more singles, which did not match their previous successes. The only album they made with the original line-up was their 1979 debut Smash and Grab. The band's hits were either written and/or produced by Mike Chapman and Nicky Chinn.

The band formally split in 1985. 

In 1990, Racey reformed after Wilson and Fursdon were approached to play at a Fourth of July party. Miller died of cancer on 6 May 2003. In 1991, Richard Gower formed his own version of the group with Gary Combes, who had played keyboard in the group from 1980 onwards. Both groups are still active and performing. Several albums and CDs, with re-recordings of the original hits as well as new material, are available from both of the present-day versions of the group.

In August 2021, the band released "It's a Glorious Day".

Discography

Albums

Studio albums

Compilation albums

Singles

References

External links

English pop music groups
English glam rock groups
English new wave musical groups
People from Weston-super-Mare
Rak Records artists
Musical groups established in 1976
Musical groups disestablished in 1985